Thaumaglossa tonkinea, is a species of skin beetle found in Malaysia, Singapore, Thailand, Vietnam, China, Taiwan and probably Sri Lanka.

Description
This oval shaped beetle has a total body length is about 2.5 to 2.9 mm. Cuticle black to dark brown dorsally and blackish ventrallly. Head finely punctuate with long erect white-grey pubescence. Palpi yellow. Eyes are very large. Antennae consists with 11 segments and dark-brown in color. Punctuation of pronotum fine, with long recumbent white-grey pubescence. There is a black medial spot on pronotum. Scutellum triangular, with fine puncturation and clothed with very short white pubescence. Elytra black with dark-brown apex. Epipleuron black, fringed with white pubescence. Femora dark-brown, with brown tibiae with short white setae.

References 

Dermestidae
Insects of Sri Lanka
Insects described in 1916